Korsztyn  is a settlement in the administrative district of Gmina Grunwald, within Ostróda County, Warmian-Masurian Voivodeship, in northern Poland. It is located in Masuria.

The village was founded by Poles.

References

Villages in Ostróda County